Prakit Dankhuntod (Thai ประกิต ด่านขุนทด), is a Thai futsal goalkeeper, and currently a member of  Thailand national futsal team.

He competed for Thailand at the 2012 FIFA Futsal World Cup finals in Thailand.

References
 

Prakit Dankhuntod
1983 births
Living people
Prakit Dankhuntod
Futsal goalkeepers
Prakit Dankhuntod